Melissa Moore may refer to:

Melissa Moore (actress) (born 1963), American B-movie actress
Melissa Moore (athlete) (born 1968), Australian Olympic sprinter
Melissa G. Moore, daughter of Keith Hunter Jesperson